Hendrik "Hendrie" Krüzen (born 24 November 1964) is a Dutch former professional footballer who played as a midfielder. He is the assistant manager of Heracles Almelo.

Club career
Krüzen was born in Almelo, Overijssel. He made his senior debuts at only 16, with hometown's Heracles Almelo. After two solid years with FC Den Bosch, scoring in double figures, he signed with Eredivisie giants PSV Eindhoven, appearing rarely as the club won the double in the 1988–89 season, and also being loaned to his previous team.

Krüzen spent the following five years in neighbouring Belgium, representing K.V. Kortrijk, R.F.C. de Liège and K.S.V. Waregem. After the latter's relegation from the top flight, he returned to his country, joining first professional club Heracles, and moving to AZ Alkmaar in January 1996.

In 2002, after a spell in the Dutch second level with Go Ahead Eagles and two years in amateur football, Krüzen retired from football after 20 professional seasons, with totals of 556 games and 148 goals. Immediately afterwards, he returned to his first team, acting as assistant coach for several years.

International career
Krüzen made his debut for the Netherlands on 16 December 1987, in a UEFA Euro 1988 qualifier against Greece (3–0 away win).

He would be selected by manager Rinus Michels for the final stages in West Germany, being an unused member as the national team won the tournament.

Honours
Heracles
 Second Division: 1984–85, 1994–95

PSV
 Dutch League: 1988–89
 Dutch Cup: 1988–89

Netherlands
UEFA European Football Championship: 1988

External links
Beijen profile 
 

1964 births
Living people
Sportspeople from Almelo
Dutch footballers
Footballers from Overijssel
Association football midfielders
Eredivisie players
Eerste Divisie players
Heracles Almelo players
PSV Eindhoven players
FC Den Bosch players
AZ Alkmaar players
Go Ahead Eagles players
Belgian Pro League players
RFC Liège players
K.V. Kortrijk players
Netherlands international footballers
UEFA Euro 1988 players
UEFA European Championship-winning players
Heracles Almelo non-playing staff
Dutch expatriate footballers
Dutch expatriate sportspeople in Belgium
Expatriate footballers in Belgium